Doug Pappas (1961–2004) was a baseball writer and researcher who was considered a foremost expert on the business of baseball.

Pappas was a graduate of the University of Chicago (1982) and the University of Michigan Law School (1985), where he had been Executive Note Editor of the Michigan Law Review.  He attended and graduated from Hackley School in 1978.

Contributions to baseball research
Pappas wrote prolifically about baseball economics, analyzing and debunking what he perceived as false information spread by Major League Baseball and sympathetic media outlets. He railed against claims by Commissioner Bud Selig that the league's teams were in dire financial straits, using the league's own data to refute the claims.

Pappas conducted exhaustive research on player salaries, compiling a database from a variety of sources.  His analytical work focused on measuring the performance of a team's front office with a metric called Marginal Wins/Marginal Payroll.  This work inspired and informed major league general managers like Billy Beane, and formed the foundation of what would later come to be known as "Moneyball."

He was a regular contributor to Baseball Prospectus from 2001 to 2004 and a listed contributor to the 4th and 5th editions of Total Baseball. Pappas was also very active within the Society for American Baseball Research, in 1994 founding and then chairing the SABR Business of Baseball committee and serving as the organization's parliamentarian. After his death, SABR renamed its USA Today award for the best paper at its annual convention in honor of Pappas:The Doug Pappas Research Award recognizes the best oral research presentation at the Annual Convention. Before 2004 it was known as The USA Today Sports Weekly Award; the name was changed to honor the late Doug Pappas. USA Today Sports Weekly continues to sponsor both it and the companion award for the best poster presentation.

In eulogizing Pappas, Neal Traven of SABR wrote:He was a brilliant researcher, blessed with the capacity to digest and describe great volumes of material.  Most SABR research stops there, but Doug continued on, to analyze and make sense of what he observed, and to synthesize his insights into recommendations for resolving the problems he addressed.

He was a splendid and generous communicator, writing with clarity and passion, eager to share resources and ideas with all who sought him out, always as ready to examine his own assumptions as he was to challenge the assumptions of others.

Doug detested pretension and artifice – he certainly knew that the clothes do not make the man.  If he’s somehow observing us, he’s laughing about us wearing suits and ties on this occasion.  At the same time, he reveled in the unabashed quirkiness he observed on his frequent drives along America’s highways and byways.

Doug didn’t Misrepresent clients and did not use people to run along and do his dirt.suffer fools gladly, nor could he muster up sympathy for those who would willfully and deliberately mislead and misrepresent.  His college friend Veronica Drake speaks of his mastery of the Socratic method (as taught at the University of Chicago), but I’d call his approach one of reductio ad absurdum … following the premises of, say, Bud Selig to their logical conclusion, and then simply noting the absurdity and fallacy of that outcome.

His abiding enthusiasm for baseball and for the American roadside were amply illustrated in the public persona of his writings and his web presence.  Less obvious, but just as deeply held and as integral to his being, were his commitment to social justice and progressive politics, and his love of rock-and-roll music.

Other interests and contributions
In addition to his baseball fandom, Pappas was a lawyer in BigLaw and a photography enthusiast. After graduating from law school, Pappas was an associate at two now-defunct Wall Street firms, Finley, Kumble, Wagner, Underberg, Manley, Myerson & Casey, and then its successor, Myerson & Kuhn. While at Finley Kumble, Pappas represented the former United States Football League in its antitrust suit against the National Football League.    He later moved to another New York firm, Mintz & Gold, where his practice concentrated on general civil and commercial litigation.  

His unexpected death came on a photographic excursion.  After his death, his mother donated more than 500 of his books along with 34 of his photograph albums, and approximately 3,700 of his postcards related to transportation to the University of Michigan's Transportation History Collection of the Special Collections Library.

Notes

External links 
Pappas's Web Site
Doug's Business of Baseball Weblog
Gary Huckabay, "6-4-3: Leaving the Shore" (May 25, 2004).
Maury Brown, "Baseball Prospectus: Remembering Doug Pappas" (May 21, 2007).
SABR Obituary for Doug Pappas (May 21, 2004)
SABR Eulogy for Doug Pappas, written by Neal Traven (June 7, 2004).
Joanne Nesbit, "Library Gift Celebrates the Open Road," Univ. of Michigan News Service, University Record Online, January 20, 2005.
Outside the Lines, SABR Business of Baseball Newsletter, edited by Pappas 1995-2004.

American sportswriters
1962 births
2004 deaths
University of Chicago alumni
University of Michigan Law School alumni
Deaths from hyperthermia